RTC is a New Zealand record label which licensed recordings from overseas Independent labels in the United States and in the United Kingdom.

Background
The label was started in the late 1970s by John McCready, Brian Pitts, and Warwick Woodward. While still a fledgling indie distributor, they had Kama Fitzgerald in their employ who had previously worked for PolyGram marketing manager Stuart Rubin. In 1980, it was reported by Phil Gifford in the October 11 issue of Billboard that as an independent NZ label they had made a first. With the artists on their label having both an album and single at no 1 on the NZ charts, it was the first time an Independent label in New Zealand had achieved this. The album at the top of the charts was Black Sea by XTC, and the single was "Food For Thought" by UB 40. In 1981, it was reported by Glenn A. Baker in the September 19 edition of Billboard that the Australian Liberation label was sub-licensing recordings to RTC. However one act Mink DeVille, was to be excluded and instead be given to WEA New Zealand, due to its managing director Tim Murdoch having a personal interest in the band. In 1982, the label's way they packaged limited edition albums and singles worked well. In a week, the limited edition 7 inch picture sleeves of the groups Heaven 17 and were sold out.

Staff
As of 1979, the managing director of the label was Brian Pitts. The Promotions manager was Kama Fitzgerald.

New Zealand artists

Kevin  Blackatini & the Frigids
Kevin Blackatini And The Frigids were an outfit that had a novelty hit in 1981 with "The Fridge", which was a parody of "The Bridge" which was previously a hit for Deane Waretini. Kevin Blackatini was actually Kevin Black from Auckland radio station, Radio Hauraki.

Gary Havoc & The Hurricanes
Auckland band, Gary Havoc & The Hurricanes, had an EP/mini-album issued on the label in 1979, The credited musicians on the recording were Havoc on guitar and vocals, John Treseder on lead guitar, Gavin Beardsmore  on bass, and Graeme Scott on drums. Drummer Gary Hunt had left to join the Terrorways. According to John Dix, in his book Stranded in Paradise: New Zealand Rock'n'Roll, 1955-1988, the group have noted as being responsible for being one of the first, if not the first New Zealand band to self-finance their record and be successful with it,  which had a flow on effect for other bands. They received an IRANZ award for their EP. In the mid 1980s, Havoc teamed up with singer / keyboardist Suzie Divine, calling themselves Desire. They released a record on WEA in 1985 which featured Mark Huckstep and Robbie Robertson on bass and Simon Hannah and Mark Hansen on drums.

International artists
Some of the international artists marketed by the label include Ian Matthews whose single "Shake It" RTC RTS 701 had climbed from no 28 to 19.  Others include Joy Division.

Releases (selective)

7" singles

References

New Zealand independent record labels